The 2011 Western & Southern Open, also known as the Cincinnati Open, was a tennis tournament played on outdoor hard courts at the Lindner Family Tennis Center in Mason, Ohio, United States. The tournament was a joint men's and women's event, with six new courts being built for the tournament. The competition took place from August 15 through August 21, 2011. The 110th edition of the Cincinnati Open (83rd for the women), it was a Masters 1000 event on the 2011 ATP World Tour, and part of the Premier Series of the 2011 WTA Tour.

Points and prize money

Point distribution

Prize money

ATP entrants

Seeds

 Seedings are based on the rankings of August 8, 2011.

Other entrants
The following players received wildcards into the singles main draw:
  James Blake
  Grigor Dimitrov
  Robby Ginepri
  Ryan Harrison

The following players received entry from the qualifying draw:

  Julien Benneteau
  Alex Bogomolov Jr.
  Ernests Gulbis
  Marsel İlhan
  Kei Nishikori
  Édouard Roger-Vasselin
  Radek Štěpánek

Withdrawals
  Lleyton Hewitt
  Ivan Ljubičić
  Milos Raonic
  Tommy Robredo
  Robin Söderling (wrist injury)

WTA entrants

Seeds

 Seedings are based on the rankings of August 8, 2011.

Other entrants
The following players received wildcards into the singles main draw
  Polona Hercog
  Christina McHale
  Maria Sharapova
  Sloane Stephens

The following players received entry from the qualifying draw:

  Eleni Daniilidou
  Kimiko Date-Krumm
  Petra Cetkovská
  Jill Craybas
  Alexa Glatch
  Bojana Jovanovski
  Petra Martić
  Monica Niculescu
  Anastasia Rodionova
  Chanelle Scheepers
  Zhang Shuai
  Zheng Jie

The following players received entry from a lucky loser spot:
  María José Martínez Sánchez
  Sofia Arvidsson
  Pauline Parmentier

Withdrawals
  Dominika Cibulková (abdominal injury) 
  Kim Clijsters (abdominal injury) 
  Alexandra Dulgheru
  Kaia Kanepi
  Bethanie Mattek-Sands
  Tamira Paszek
  Agnieszka Radwańska (right shoulder injury) 
  Victoria Azarenka (right hand injury)
  Venus Williams (viral illness)

Finals

Men's singles

 Andy Murray def.  Novak Djokovic, 6–4, 3–0, ret.
 It was Murray's 2nd title of the year and 18th of his career. It was his 1st Masters 1000 title of the year and 7th of his career. It was his 2nd win at Cincinnati, also winning in 2008. It was the second defeat for Djokovic in the season.

Women's singles

 Maria Sharapova def.  Jelena Janković, 4–6, 7–6(7–3), 6–3
It was Sharapova's 2nd title of the year and 24th of her career.

Men's doubles

 Mahesh Bhupathi /  Leander Paes def.  Michaël Llodra /  Nenad Zimonjić, 7–6(7–4), 7–6(7–2)

Women's doubles

 Vania King /  Yaroslava Shvedova def.  Natalie Grandin /  Vladimíra Uhlířová, 6–4, 3–6, [11–9]

References

External links
 
 Association of Tennis Professionals (ATP) tournament profile

 
2011 ATP World Tour
2011 WTA Tour
2011
August 2011 sports events in the United States